Hoseynabad-e Yek may refer to:
 Hoseynabad-e Yek, Arzuiyeh
 Hoseynabad-e Yek, Bardsir
 Hoseynabad-e Yek, Jiroft
 Hoseynabad-e Yek, Kerman
 Hoseynabad-e Yek, Kuhbanan